The Rennell white-eye (Zosterops rennellianus) or  the bare-ringed white-eye, is a species of bird in the family Zosteropidae. It is endemic to Rennell Island in the Solomon Islands. Its natural habitat is subtropical or tropical moist lowland forests.

References

Rennell white-eye
Birds of Rennell Island
Rennell white-eye
Rennell white-eye
Taxonomy articles created by Polbot